Ted Lewis may refer to:

Ted Lewis (baseball) (1872–1936), Welsh-born professional baseball player in Boston, university president
Ted Lewis (computer scientist) (born 1941), American computer scientist and mathematician, and professor at the Naval Postgraduate School
Ted Lewis (musician) (1890–1971), American bandleader, musician, entertainer, singer
Ted Lewis (voice actor) (born 1969), American voice actor
Ted Lewis (writer) (1940–1982), English crime novelist
Ted "Kid" Lewis (1893–1970), English world boxing champion

See also
Edward Lewis (disambiguation)
Theodore Lewis (disambiguation)
Duris Maxwell (born 1946), Canadian drummer who has used the alias Ted Lewis